Following is a list of active chapters and colonies of Alpha Epsilon Phi sorority in the United States and Canada.

Undergraduate chapters 
Active chapters are indicated in bold. Inactive chapters are indicated in italic.

References

Alpha Epsilon Phi
chapters